Lisa Vidal (born June 13, 1965) is an American actress of Puerto Rican heritage. She starred in the Lifetime crime drama series The Division (2001–2004) and BET drama series Being Mary Jane (2013–2019). Vidal also starred in the short-lived series include High Incident (1996–97) and The Event (2010–11), and had major recurring roles on Third Watch (1999–2001), and ER (2001–04).

Early life
Vidal was born in Whitestone, Queens, the daughter of Josie, a secretary, and Manny Vidal, a tax consultant and businessman. Her parents moved from Puerto Rico and settled in Manhattan, where Vidal and her two sisters Christina and Tanya were born. She also has a brother named Christian. After Vidal finished her elementary education, she auditioned and was accepted in the Fiorello H. LaGuardia High School. When she graduated, Vidal went to work with La Familia Theater Company, alongside Raul Julia and Julia Roberts. Vidal was 14 years old when she acted in the theatre series Oye Willie and later on made her feature debut with a small role in Delivery Boys. Soon, she was working in television with parts in shows such as The Cosby Show.

Career
In 1992, Vidal appeared in the crime drama film Night and the City alongside Robert De Niro and Jessica Lange, directed by Irwin Winkler. She starred alongside Lauren Vélez and Rita Moreno in the 1994 comedy-drama film I Like It Like That. From 1994–1995, she appeared in New York Undercover in a recurring role as a reporter named Carmen. In the series she was sister to Det. Eddie Torres, played by Michael DeLorenzo. In 1995, she did some Off-Broadway and worked in The Commish. Vidal has also appeared in number of other films, such as Mighty Aphrodite (1995), The Wonderful Ice Cream Suit (1998) and Chasing Papi (2003). She played a leading role in the 2007 psychological horror film Dark Mirror.

Vidal was series regular in the ABC police drama High Incident (1995–1996), and on The Brian Benben Show in 1998, and later had major recurring roles on Third Watch from 1999–2001 as Dr. Sarah Morales, and ER from 2001–2004 as firefighter Sandy Lopez. From 2001 to 2004, Vidal starred opposite Bonnie Bedelia in the Lifetime drama series The Division, for which she received the 2002 nomination for the ALMA Award in the Best Actress Category. In 2006, she had a brief role in the short-lived action series Smith, as one of the federal agents looking for Ray Liotta's group of thieves. In 2010 she starred in NBC drama The Event playing the First Lady of the United States. Vidal also starred in a number of made-for-television movies, including The Taking of Pelham One Two Three (1998), Naughty or Nice (2004), and Odd Girl Out (2005).

In 2013, Vidal began starring opposite Gabrielle Union in the BET drama series Being Mary Jane, playing the role of Kara Lynch: the executive producer of Mary Jane show. The series ended in 2017, and in 2019 BET released a two-hour film finale. From 2015 to 2017, she also had a recurring role in the Fox comedy-drama series Rosewood. Vidal also guest-starred on American Horror Story, Shameless and Chicago P.D. In 2020, Vidal was cast as Mari Garcia, the lead character’s mother, in ABC romantic comedy-drama series The Baker and the Beauty.

Personal life
Vidal has been married to real estate agent Jay Cohen since 1990 and had two sons, Scott (1992–2021) and Max (b. 1998) and daughter Olivia-Taylor (b. 2003). The family lives in Los Angeles. She previously owned a children's clothing store called Oodles in Studio City, Los Angeles, California, but it has since been closed. Vidal is a breast cancer survivor.

Filmography

Film

Television

References

External links

1965 births
Actresses from New York City
American film actresses
American people of Puerto Rican descent
American television actresses
Living people
20th-century American actresses
21st-century American actresses
People from Whitestone, Queens